Théodore is the French version of the masculine given name Theodore.

Given name
Théodore Caruelle d'Aligny (1798–1871), French landscape painter and engraver
Théodore Anne (1892–1917), French playwright, librettist, and novelist
Théodore Année (1810 – after 1865), French horticulturist
Théodore Jean Arcand (born 1934), Canadian diplomat
Théodore Aubanel (1829–1886), Provençal poet
Théodore Aubert (1878–1963), Swiss lawyer and writer
Théodore Bachelet (1820–1879), French historian and musicologist
Théodore Bainconneau (fl. 1920), French wrestler
Théodore Ballu (1817–1885), French architect 
Théodore de Banville (1823–1891), French poet and writer
Théodore Baribeau (1870–1937), Quebec politician
Théodore Baron (1840–1899), Belgian painter
Théodore Barrière (1823–1877), French dramatist
Théodore Baudouin d'Aubigny (1780–1866), French playwright
Théodore de Bèze (1519–1605), French Protestant theologian
Théodore Botrel (1868–1925), French singer-songwriter, poet and playwright
Théodore Champion (1873–1954), Swiss cyclist, philatelist and stamp dealer
Théodore Chassériau (1819–1856), French Romantic painter
Théodore Cornut (fl. 1765), French mathematician and military architect
Théodore Deck (1823-1891), French potter
Théodore Dézamy (1808–1850), French socialist
Théodore Drouhet (1817–1904), Governor General of French India
Théodore Dubois (1837–1924), French composer, organist and music teacher
Théodore Ducos (1801–1855), French politician and shipowner
Théodore Duret (1838–1927), French journalist, author and art critic
Théodore Flournoy (1854–1920), Swiss psychologist
Théodore Fourmois (1814–1871), Belgian landscape painter and printmaker
Théodore Frère (1814–1888), French Orientalist painter
Théodore Gardelle (1722–1761), Swiss painter and enameller
Théodore Géricault (1791–1824), French painter and lithographer
Théodore Gervais (1868–1940), Canadian doctor and politician
Théodore Gosselin (1855–1935), French historian and playwright
Théodore Guérin (1798–1856), French nun, founder of the Sisters of Providence of Saint Mary-of-the-Woods
Théodore Herpin (1799–1865), French neurologist
Théodore Holo (born 1948), Beninese politician, academic, and judge
Théodore Basset de Jolimont (1787–1854), French artist, lithographer, painter and antiquary
Théodore Simon Jouffroy (1796–1842), French philosopher
Théodore Juste (1818–1888), Belgian historian and literary scholar
Théodore Hersart de La Villemarqué (1815–1895), French philologist
Théodore Labarre (1805–1870), French harpist and composer
Théodore Lack (1846–1921), French pianist and composer
Théodore Lajarte (1826–1890), French musicologist and librarian
Théodore Legault (1886–1935), Ontario merchant and political figure
Théodore Limperg (1879–1961), Dutch economist
Théodore Maunoir (1806–1869), Swiss surgeon and co-founder of the International Committee of the Red Cross
Théodore de Mayerne (1573–1654), Swiss-born physician to the kings of France and England
Théodore Michel (fl. 1920), Luxembourgian swimmer
Théodore Edme Mionnet (1770–1842), French numismatist
Théodore Monbeig (1875–1914), French Catholic missionary and botanist
Théodore Monod (1902–2000), French naturalist, explorer, and humanist scholar
Théodore Muret (1808–1866), French playwright, poet, essayist and historian
Théodore Nézel (1799–1854), French playwright and librettist
Théodore Nouwens (1908–1974), Belgian footballer
Théodore Nzue Nguema (born 1973), Gabonese footballer
Théodore Olivier (1793–1853), French mathematician
Théodore Pescatore (1802–1878), Luxembourgian politician
Théodore Pilette (1883–1921), Belgian racecar driver
Théodore Poussin, protagonist in the French comic book series of the same name
Théodore Ralli (1852–1909), Greek painter, watercolourist and draughtsman in France
Théodore Ravanat (1812–18833), French landscape painter
Théodore Reinach (1860–1928), French archaeologist and scholar
Théodore Richomme (1785–1849), French engraver
Théodore Ritter (1840–1886), French composer and pianist
Théodore Robitaille (1834–1897), Canadian physician and politician
Théodore Rousseau (1812–1867), French painter 
Théodore Eugène César Ruyssen (1868–1967), French historian and pacifist
Théodore Salomé (1834–1896), French organist and composer
Théodore Sidot (fl. 1866), French chemist 
Théodore Simon (1872–1961), French psychologist 
Théodore Sindikubwabo (1928–1998), interim President of Rwanda during the Rwandan genocide
Théodore Steeg (1868–1950), French philosopher and Premier of the French Third Republic.
Théodore Tronchin (1582–1657), Swiss Calvinist theologian
Théodore Tronchin (1709–1892), Swiss physician
Théodore Turrettini (1845–1916), Swiss engineer and politician
Théodore Varvier (1884–1913), French rugby player
Théodore Vernier (1731–1818), French lawyer and politician during the revolution
Théodore Vienne (1864–1921), French  textile manufacturer and founder of the Paris–Roubaix cycle race
Théodore Wichwael (died 1519), Auxiliary Bishop of Cologne

Surname
Gérard Théodore (1920–2012), French World War II soldier
Jean-François Théodore (1946–2015), French businessman and CEO of Euronext
José Théodore (born 1976), Canadian ice hockey goaltender

Other
 , a tragedy by Pierre Corneille

French masculine given names